The enzyme 3α,7α,12α-trihydroxy-5β-cholest-24-enoyl-CoA hydratase catalyzes the chemical reaction

(24R,25R)-3α,7α,12α,24-tetrahydroxy-5β-cholestanoyl-CoA 
(24E)-3α,7α,12α-trihydroxy-5β-cholest-24-enoyl-CoA + H2O

Nomenclature 

This enzyme belongs to the family of lyases, specifically the hydro-lyases, which cleave carbon-oxygen bonds.  The systematic name of this enzyme class is (24R,25R)-3α,7α,12α,24-tetrahydroxy-5beta-cholestanoyl-CoA hydro-lyase [(24E)-3α,7α,12α-trihydroxy-5β-cholest-24-enoyl-CoA-forming]. Other names in common use include 46 kDa hydratase 2, and (24R,25R)-3α,7α,12α,24-tetrahydroxy-5β-cholestanoyl-CoA hydro-lyase.

References

Further reading 

 
 
 
 
 
 

EC 4.2.1
Enzymes of unknown structure